Nationality words link to articles with information on the nation's poetry or literature (for instance, Irish or France).

Events

Works published
 Richard Brome, perhaps the editor, Lachrymae Musarum: The Tears of the Muses, anonymous collection of elegies on the death of Henry, Lord Hastings; assumed to have been assembled by Brome
 Richard Lovelace, Lucasta: Epodes, Odes, Sonnets, Songs, &c., to which is added Aramantha, A Pastoral., London: Tho. Harper (see also Lucasta: Posthume Poems 1659)
 John Ogilby, translator, The Works of Publius Virgilius Maro, translation from the original Latin, "a respectable and often sumptuously printed work [...] which, until [John] Dryden's folio [of 1697], was not superseded", according to 20th century critic Mark Van Doren
 Thomas Stanley, the elder, Europa. Cupid Crucified. Venus Vigils
 George Wither, Carmen Eucharisticon
 Elegies on the execution of King Charles I of England on January 30:
 Henry King, A Groane at the Funerall of that Incomparable and Glorious Monarch, Charles the First
 Thomas Pierce, anonymously, Caroli τοῦ μακαρίτου Παλιγγενεσία, 1649
 Monumentum Regale, a Tombe for Charles I, collection

Births
Death years link to the corresponding "[year] in poetry" article:
 April 16 – Jan Luyken (died 1712), Dutch
 September 26 – Katharyne Lescailje (died 1711), Dutch

Deaths
Birth years link to the corresponding "[year] in poetry" article:
 June 20 – Maria Tesselschade Visscher (born 1594), Dutch
 December 4 – William Drummond of Hawthornden (born 1585), Scottish
 Richard Crashaw, (born 1613), English poet, styled "the divine," one of the Metaphysical poets
 Ascanio Pio (born unknown), Italian dramatic poet
 Jean Sirmond (born 1589), French neo-Latin poet and man of letters
 Manuel de Faria e Sousa (born 1590), Portuguese historian and poet
 Giovanni Valentini (born 1582), Italian Baroque composer, poet and keyboard virtuoso

See also

 Poetry
 17th century in poetry
 17th century in literature
 Cavalier poets in England, who supported the monarch against the puritans in the English Civil War

Notes

17th-century poetry
Poetry